Paulo Lozano is an aerospace engineer focusing in space propulsion, electrospray thrusters, micro- and nanofabrication, space mission design, small satellite technology development, ion beams, and additive manufacturing. He is currently the M. Aleman-Velasco Professor of Aeronautics and Astronautics, as well as Director of the Space Propulsion Laboratory at the Massachusetts Institute of Technology.

References 

MIT School of Engineering faculty
American aerospace engineers
Living people
Year of birth missing (living people)
Place of birth missing (living people)
American people of Mexican descent